The Austria national baseball team is the national baseball team of Austria. The team competes in the bi-annual European Baseball Championship. The coaching staff consists of General Manager Robert Buchelt (AUT), Head Coach Hiro Sakanashi (JPY), Pitching Coach Adam Koontz (USA) and Assistant Coach Owen Reid (USA).

Placings 
European Baseball Championship

European Under-21 Baseball Championship

European Junior Baseball Championship

European Cadets Baseball Championship

European Juveniles Baseball Championship

See also 

Baseball in Austria (German Wikipedia)
Austrian Baseball League (German Wikipedia)

References

External links 
 Austrian Baseball Federation official website (in German)

Baseball in Austria
National baseball teams in Europe
Baseball